is a fictional character created by Nintendo for the Metroid series. She is one of the most prominent antagonists within the series, serving as the main antagonist of Metroid and Super Metroid.

Mother Brain has been killed multiple times by series protagonist Samus Aran. Her Super Metroid design was originally milder than its final version, resembling an "old lady living in an apartment complex" when designed by Toru Osawa. This design was altered by Tomomi Yamane, who gave her an overall more monstrous appearance. She takes the form of a large brain that sits within a jar, from which she controls the Space Pirates on the fictional planet Zebes. Since Super Metroid (1994), she has had a single large eye.

Mother Brain has made several appearances in other media, most notably as the primary antagonist in Captain N: The Game Master. Since appearing in the Metroid series, she has received positive reception.

Concept and characteristics
Mother Brain is depicted as a very large brain with cybernetic spikes, usually contained in a glass tube which Samus must break to attack it. However, in the Super NES video game Super Metroid, she is seen in a bipedal form. When designing the bipedal version of Mother Brain for Super Metroid, Toru Osawa described what he wanted her to look like as being an "old lady living in my apartment complex". Tomomi Yamane added to the design, giving her dripping saliva, foul breath, and a filthy appearance.

Appearances

In video games
Mother Brain first appeared in the NES video game, Metroid, and again in the third Metroid title, Super Metroid. She would appear again in the Game Boy Advance video game Metroid: Zero Mission, a remake of the NES Metroid, which explains what happens after Mother Brain's defeat. The Wii video game Metroid Prime 3: Corruption revealed that the Galactic Federation had constructed biomechanical supercomputers called Auroras, and that there were plans for a "Future Aurora Complex", which appears to be the Mother Brain depicted in Super Metroid. In Metroid: Other M, the scene of Mother Brain destroying the baby Metroid is reenacted in an FMV cutscene. Also, the primary antagonist of Other M, MB, is an android partially constructed from Mother Brain's DNA, hence the initialism (which is shared with its human matrix, Madeline Bergman).

Mother Brain makes cameos in various video games, including WarioWare, Inc.: Mega Microgame$!, Super Smash Bros. Brawl, and Tetris DS. She appears as an Assist Trophy in Super Smash Bros. for Nintendo 3DS and Wii U and Super Smash Bros. Ultimate which when summoned, appears in her glass tube and spawns Rinkas around the stage. She also fires her Hyper Beam as seen in Super Metroid.

In other media
Mother Brain makes multiple appearances in other media, most notably in Captain N: The Game Master, where she serves as the series' primary antagonist. She has three minions under her command—King Hippo from the Punch-Out!! series, Dr. Wily from the Mega Man series and Eggplant Wizard from the Kid Icarus series. In the show, she was voiced by Levi Stubbs of the Four Tops. This depiction of Mother Brain appears in other media, including the Nintendo Comics System and the Captain N comic books. The character appears in other comics as well, including a manga based on Metroid: Zero Mission, as well as a Nintendo Power comic book based on Super Metroid.

Reception
Since her appearance in the original Metroid, Mother Brain has received mostly positive reception. She ranked in as the ninth-best video game villain by IGN, stating that it would win an ugly contest "hands down". She placed seventh on a reader poll conducted by GameSpot. She made 1UP.com's 25 most badass boss fights list, the authors calling it one of the most emotionally moving climactic battles in video game history. The GameSpy staff included Mother Brain as one of their favourite bosses; Ryan Scott specifically praised it as being one of the most "jaw-dropping" battles in video game history. Developer Ron Alpert described Mother Brain as being iconic. A brief mention of her is made in an article written by IGN about fellow Metroid antagonist Ridley, commenting that he is the true antagonist of the series. While discussing Mother Brain's possibility as a character in Super Smash Bros. Brawl, IGN editor Lucas M. Thomas comments that while she would not make a good playable character, she could be a quality part of a level. Guinness World Records Gamer's Edition listed Mother Brain as 36th in their list of "top 50 video game villains". Cracked named her one of the best Nintendo villains, joking that she was the "Osama Bin Laden of space", due to her hiding in an underground lair giving orders to dangerous fanatics. They also mocked her depiction in Captain N, commenting that "for want of any actual comedy, she was given the voice of a sassy black woman, which was an acceptable substitute at the time".

The Boston Phoenix editors Ryan Stewart and Mitch Krpata named Mother Brain the fourth-greatest boss in video game history, stating that while she had triumphant roles in Metroid and Captain N, she didn't come into her own until Super Metroid. They cited the overall quality of the ending for why she was so notable in this role. GameDaily listed Mother Brain as the 12th-best evil mastermind in video games. GamesRadar+ editor David Houghton listed Mother Brain as one gaming's most hideous mums, describing her as looking like a "turd on a stick jammed into the top of a long-dead chicken". In explaining why Metroid was among gaming's greatest games, GameSpot editor Avery Score cited the battles with Mother Brain and Kraid, describing the battles as epic. Fellow GameSpot editor Giancarlo Varanini described Mother Brain as "appropriately disgusting". GamePro listed Mother Brain as the sixth-most-diabolical video game villain, describing the battle with her as one of the most notorious and epic assaults in gaming history. UGO.com listed Mother Brain as one of the runners-up for the "Miss Entertainment", commenting that she has sadly diminished in her attempts to thwart Samus, though they hope that she returns. Mother Brain is also featured in the ongoing GameSpot's all-time greatest game villain. In 2011, Complex ranked her as sixth on the list of "most diabolical video game she-villains".

References

Artificial intelligence characters in video games
Cyborg characters in video games
extraterrestrial supervillains
Female characters in video games
Female video game villains
Fictional computers
Fictional gynoids
Fictional extraterrestrial life forms
Fictional monsters
Intelligent Systems characters
Metroid characters
Nintendo antagonists
Robot characters in video games
Video game bosses
Video game characters introduced in 1986
Video game characters with slowed ageing
Video game mascots